State Route 25 (SR-25), also part of the designated Fishlake Scenic Byway, is a state highway in the south central portion of the U.S. state of Utah. SR-25 runs from the junction of SR-24 near the town of Koosharem northeast to the west shore of Fish Lake.

Route description

Fishlake Scenic Byway is a route of  that traverses mainly through the Fishlake National Forest, Utah. The byway comprises SR-25 and County Roads FAS-2554 and FAS-3268, beginning at SR-24, and running to SR-72. The byway starts at an intersection with SR-24 and immediately turns north-northeast through mountainous terrain before descending into a basin where Fish Lake is located. The route continues northeast and passes the west shore of Fish Lake, Johnson Valley Reservoir, and ending at the junction of SR-72, just nine miles northeast of the township of Loa in southeast Utah.

History
The road from SR-24 at Plateau Junction east to Fish Lake was added to the state highway system in 1918, and numbered SR-25 by the state legislature in 1927. The west end was moved south to Fish Lake Junction in 1935 as a federal aid project, but the legislative description was not changed until 1953.
The Fishlake Scenic Byway was designated on April 9, 1990 on SR-25 between SR-24 and Johnson Valley Reservoir. The Byway was extended in August 1992 between Johnson Valley Reservoir and SR-72 to comprise the southern portion of the Gooseberry/Fremont Road Scenic Backway.

Pando, a clonal quaking aspen stand, that, according to some sources, is the oldest (80,000 years) and largest organism on Earth, is located 1 mile (1.61 km) southwest of Fish Lake on Utah route 25.

Major intersections

References

External links

025
025
 025
 025